Lennox Johnston, (1899 – 18 January 1986) Glaswegian GP and amateur scientist who pioneered research in the addictiveness of nicotine in the 1930s. Dismissed during his own lifetime as a fanatic, he has remained a marginal figure and is now rather forgotten.

Early life
Johnston was educated at Ayr Academy and Glasgow University. He graduated MB, ChB in 1921, having served as a medical student in Royal Navy minesweepers in the North Sea during the first world war. He started to smoke at the age of 16 and continued for 12 years. He was married to his wife Frieda for 55 years. They had a son, Ivor, and two daughters, Heather and Sandra.

Career
In a paper published in the Lancet in 1942 and titled Tobacco smoking and nicotine, he identified smoking as one of the main causes of lung cancer and effectively became one of the first anti-smoking campaigners by suggesting a total ban on smoking.

His views were based on an experiment of his own device in which he injected himself with heavy doses of nicotine, almost killing himself several times in the process. He subsequently enlisted the help of 35 volunteers and found that they eventually preferred nicotine injections to cigarettes.

In the 1950s, Dr Johnston was refused research funding by the Medical Research Council and his key paper was rejected by the (pipe-smoking) editor of the British Medical Journal. After storming out of the editorial offices shouting ‘Addict! Addict! Addict!’ he devised a plan to burn down the headquarters of the BMA, on which, according to his memoirs, he reflected ‘many hundreds of time in bed at night’.

He was the president of the National Society of Non-Smokers for many years

In 1957 he published a short book titled The disease of tobacco smoking and its cure.

External links

 Lennox Johnston in his own words (includes BMJ obituary) Archived

Anti-smoking activists
1899 births
1986 deaths
Alumni of the University of Glasgow
20th-century Scottish medical doctors
British health activists